The Leary–Lettvin debate was a May 3, 1967 debate between Dr. Jerome Lettvin, a medical doctor and professor at MIT, and Dr. Timothy Leary, a licensed psychologist, about the merits and dangers of the hallucinogenic drug LSD.  It took place in the Kresge Auditorium at the Massachusetts Institute of Technology.

Participants

Timothy Leary's credentials 
Timothy Leary focused on how the interpersonal process might be used to diagnose disorders and patterns found in human personalities. He proposed that psychedelic substances, used at proper dosages, in a stable set and setting could, under the guidance of psychologists, alter behavior in beneficial ways not easily attainable through regular therapy. Subsequently he had developed a following of admirers for the philosophy turn on, tune in, drop out. This was commonly understood to suggest that taking psychedelic drugs (in particular LSD) was valuable to average people.

Jerome Lettvin's credentials 
Trained by neurologist Denny Brown, Jerome Lettvin was a psychiatrist, neurologist, neurosurgeon, and neuroscientist with deep clinical experience and was a passionate advocate of individual rights. Having been the head of only 7 doctors controlling the 7,000 patients in Manteno State Hospital, he had direct experience diagnosing a large number of unusual neurological conditions along with their treatments, useful drugs, and their effectiveness.

Venue and preliminaries 
Leary was scheduled to debate another MIT professor at Kresge Auditorium on the MIT campus. On the day of the debate, the scheduled professor bowed out, leaving the organizers scrambling to find another professor who would take his place. Lettvin was considered a poor candidate because of his lack of conventionality and for his regular advocacy on behalf of students.
The organizers exhausted all other candidates and then came to Lettvin's laboratory in Building 20 to plead for a last minute appearance. From the middle of an experiment on a frog's optic nerve, in his shirt sleeves, he was offered a tie to wear
and went to Kresge for the debate with no preparation.

Issue and debate 

Leary proposed the sacramental use of psychedelic drugs. Much of his presentation was devoted to arguing for the necessity of scientifically studying the effects of drugs such as LSD and marijuana in order to determine the contexts in which they might be useful, and those in which they would not. In addition, Leary made a plea for the equal importance of scientifically studying the "inner world" - the world of the mind -  as well as the "outer world" of material reality. The U.S. government had made the use of these and some other drugs illegal. Lettvin was asked by the MIT organizers to respond to Leary.

The debate was televised by WGBH-TV Channel 2 in 1967. Leary began in "High Priest" mode, barefoot presentation having a multimedia projected visual backdrop. In this segment, he made the use of drugs very appealing to the students in the audience, and they responded positively. Lettvin admitted that Leary's arguments were very seductive.

With humor and without losing the audience, Lettvin followed with an appeal on behalf of the "higher" mental functions using textbook and clinical observations as support material. He also accepted many of Leary's points, arguing against the prohibition on marijuana and other drugs. He argued instead that persuasion rather than coercion should be the focus of drug policy. Lettvin criticized the U.S. government for ill-conceived anti-drug legislation.

Lettvin asserted that psilocybin causes cognitive impairment that persists long after the acute effects of the drug have passed, based on anecdotal evidence. Lettvin spoke subjectively, framing the decision to use drugs as a personal one, not a scientific one.  He spoke of "good" and "evil" and the "devil".  Lettvin told the audience that he "felt sick" for Leary.

Perhaps the most famous part of the debate was when Lettvin responded "bullshit!" to Leary's claim that he would diagnose the frank symptoms of temporal lobe epilepsy as those of a visionary mystic.

References 

Timothy Leary
Debates about social issues

1967 in education
1967 in the United States
1967 in American television